Stoyko Kolev (born on 11 April 1986) is a Bulgarian footballer currently playing for FC Karnobat as a midfielder.

Career
Kolev started his career in Naftex Burgas and played for the club in the A PFG. In January 2007 signed with Sliven 2000 for a free transfer.

References

Bulgarian footballers
1986 births
Living people
Neftochimic Burgas players
OFC Sliven 2000 players
FC Chernomorets Balchik players
PFC Nesebar players
First Professional Football League (Bulgaria) players

Association football midfielders